Labrang Monastery (Chinese: Lābǔléng Sì, 拉卜楞寺) is one of the six great monasteries of the Gelug school of Tibetan Buddhism. Its formal name is Genden Shédrup Dargyé Trashi Gyésu khyilwé Ling.

Labrang is located in Xiahe County, Gannan Tibetan Autonomous Prefecture, Gansu, in the traditional Tibetan area of Amdo. Labrang Monastery is home to the largest number of monks outside the Tibet Autonomous Region. Xiahe is about four hours by car from the provincial capital Lanzhou.

In the early part of the 20th century, Labrang was by far the largest and most influential monastery in Amdo. It is located on the Daxia River, a tributary of the Yellow River.

History
The monastery was founded in 1709 by the first Jamyang Zhépa, Ngawang Tsöndrü. It is one of Tibetan Buddhism's most important monastery town outside the Tibetan Autonomous Region.

Labrang Monastery is situated at the strategic intersection of two major Asian cultures—Tibetan and Mongolian — and was one of the largest Buddhist monastic universities. In the early 20th century, it housed several thousand monks. Labrang was also a gathering point for numerous annual religious festivals and was the seat of a Tibetan power base that strove to maintain regional autonomy through the shifting alliances and bloody conflicts that took place between 1700 and 1950.

In April 1985 the Assembly Hall burned down. It was replaced and the new building was consecrated in 1990.

Description
The monastery complex dominates the western part of the village. The white walls and gilded roofs feature a blend of Tibetan and Indian Vihara architectural styles. The monastery contains 18 halls, six institutes of learning, a gilded stupa, a sutra debate area, and houses nearly 60,000 sutras.

It has a Buddhist museum with a large collection of Buddha statues, sutras and murals. In addition, a large amount of Tibetan language books, including books on history are available for purchase, together with medicines, calendars, music and art objects.

There used to be a great gold-painted statue of the Buddha, more than 50 feet high, which was surrounded by rows of surrounding Buddhas in niches.

The monastery today is an important place for Buddhist ceremonies and activities. From January 4 to 17 and June 26, to July 15, (these dates may change according to the lunar calendar), the great Buddhist ceremony will be held with Buddha-unfolding, sutra enchanting, praying, sutra debates, etc.

Ma clique attacks

The Hui Ma clique under Generals Ma Qi and Ma Bufang launched several attacks against Labrang as part of a general anti-Golok Tibetan campaign.

Ma Qi occupied Labrang Monastery in 1917, the first time non-Tibetans had seized it. Ma Qi defeated the Tibetan forces with his Hui troops. His forces were praised by foreigners who traveled through Qinghai for their fighting abilities.

After ethnic rioting between Hui and Tibetans emerged in 1918, Ma Qi defeated the Tibetans. He heavily taxed the town for 8 years. In 1921, Ma Qi and his Muslim army decisively crushed the Tibetan monks of Labrang Monastery when they tried to oppose him. In 1925, a Tibetan rebellion broke out, with thousands of Tibetans driving out the Hui. Ma Qi responded with 3000 Hui troops, who retook Labrang and machine-gunned thousands of Tibetan monks as they tried to flee. During a 1919 attack by Muslim forces, monks were executed by burning. Bodies were left strewn around Labrang by Hui troops.

Ma Qi besieged Labrang numerous times. Tibetans fought against his Hui forces for control of Labrang until Ma Qi gave it up in 1927. However, that was not the last Labrang saw of General Ma. Ma Qi launched a genocidal war against the Goloks in 1928, inflicting a defeat upon them and seizing Labrang Monastery. The Hui forces looted and ravaged the monastery again.

The Austrian American explorer Joseph Rock encountered the aftermath of one of the Ma clique's campaigns against Labrang. The Ma army left Tibetan skeletons scattered over a wide area and Labrang Monastery was decorated with decapitated Tibetan heads. After the 1929 battle of Xiahe near Labrang, decapitated Tibetan heads were used as ornaments by Hui troops in their camp, 154 in total. Rock described "young girls and children"'s heads staked around the military encampment. Ten to fifteen heads were fastened to the saddle of every Muslim cavalryman. The heads were "strung about the walls of the Moslem garrison like a garland of flowers."

Recent events
During the Tibetan uprising anniversary in March 2008, riot police surrounded Labrang monastery and military units blocked roads to keep local people from gaining access to the monastery. Monks were prevented from leaving by Chinese security forces and held under arrest.

Footnotes

References
Cabot, Mabel H. (2003). Vanished Kingdoms: A Woman Explorer in Tibet, China & Mongolia, 1921–1925, pp. 148–157. Aperture Publishers in association with the Peabody Museum, Harvard. .
Dorje, Gyurme (2009). Footprint Tibet Handbook. Footprint Publications, Bath, England. .
 Nietupski, Paul Kocot (1999), Labrang: A Tibetan Monastery at the Crossroads of Four Civilizations. Snow Lion Publications, Ithaca, New York. .

Further reading
Makley, Charlene E. (1999). "Gendered Practices and the Inner Sanctum: The Reconstruction of Tibetan Sacred Space in "China's Tibet"." In: Sacred Spaces and Powerful Places in Tibetan Culture: A Collection of Essays, pp. 343–366. Edited by Toni Huber. Library of Tibetan Works and Archives, Dharamsala, H.P., India. .
Tamm, Eric Enno. (2010) "The Horse That Leaps Through Clouds: A Tale of Espionage, the Silk Road and the Rise of Modern China," chapter 13. Vancouver: Douglas & McIntyre. . 
Thubron, Colin (2007) Shadow of the Silk Road 58–67 (New York: HarperCollins).

Gelug monasteries
Tibetan Buddhist temples in Gannan Tibetan Autonomous Prefecture
1709 establishments in Asia
Religious organizations established in the 1700s
Amdo
Xiahe County
Major National Historical and Cultural Sites in Gansu
1700s establishments in China